United Nations General Assembly Resolution ES‑11/5 is the fifth resolution of the eleventh emergency special session of the United Nations General Assembly, adopted on 14 November 2022, calling for Russia to pay war reparations to Ukraine by creating an international reparations mechanism.

See also 
 Eleventh emergency special session of the United Nations General Assembly
 Legality of the 2022 Russian invasion of Ukraine
 United Nations General Assembly Resolution 68/262
 United Nations General Assembly Resolution ES-11/1
 United Nations General Assembly Resolution ES-11/2
 United Nations General Assembly Resolution ES-11/3
 United Nations General Assembly Resolution ES-11/4
 United Nations General Assembly resolution
 United Nations Security Council Resolution 2623

References

External links 

 Text of resolution ES-11/5 at UN Digital Library

United Nations General Assembly resolutions
2022 Russian invasion of Ukraine
Reactions to the 2022 Russian invasion of Ukraine
Russo-Ukrainian War
2022 documents
2022 in the United Nations
Ukraine and the United Nations
Russia and the United Nations
November 2022 events